The Latvian Green Party (LZP) is a green political party in Latvia.

It was founded in 1990. It was a member of the European Green Party from 2003 until its expulsion in 2019. It is positioned in the centre and leans towards the centre-right on the political spectrum, and it supports socially conservative views. The party held the world's first prime minister affiliated to a green party with Indulis Emsis who in 2004 briefly served as Prime Minister of Latvia, and the world's first head of state as party member Raimonds Vējonis served as President of Latvia between 2015 and 2019.

History
The Supreme Council of the Republic of Latvia elected in 1990 contained seven Green delegates. After the Constitution of Latvia was restored, following the collapse of the Soviet Union, the election of the 5th Saeima (1993-1995) returned one Green deputy, Anna Seile, on the list of the Latvian National Independence Movement (LNNK). In the 6th Saeima (1995-1998), there were four members: Indulis Emsis, Guntis Eniņš, Jānis Kalviņš and Jānis Rāzna.

From 1993 until 1998, the Greens were part of the governing coalition with Indulis Emsis as Minister of State for Environmental Protection. The LZP contested 1995 general election in an electoral list with the LNNK, but lost its parliamentary representation in the 1998 general election, which it contested in alliance with the Labour Party and Christian Democratic Union.

For the 2002 parliamentary election, the party formed the Union of Greens and Farmers (ZZS) with the Latvian Farmers' Union. Three members of the Green party were elected: Indulis Emsis, Arvīds Ulme and Leopolds Ozoliņš. The ZZS joined a four-party center-right coalition government and was represented with three ministers, one of them from the Green party, Minister for the Environment Raimonds Vējonis.

In February 2004, after the breakdown of the four-party government, Indulis Emsis was appointed to form a new government and became the first head of government of a country anywhere in the world from a Green party. His minority government was forced to resign in December of the same year. A new coalition government led by the People’s Party took office, in which the party was again represented as part of the ZZS.

For the 2006 parliamentary election, won four seats as part of the ZZS. The party remained part of the centre-right coalition government along with the People’s Party, Latvia's First Party/Latvian Way, and For Fatherland and Freedom. Party chairman and former prime minister Indulis Emsis became Speaker of the Saeima from November 2006 until September 2007.

Leading politicians of the party have often supported nationalist and socially conservative views, leading to its expulsion from the European Green Party on 10 November 2019.

By 2022, however, ZZS was emroiled in internal turmoil, with the Green Party announcing that it sees no way of further cooperation in the framework of ZZS with For Latvia and Ventspils, still led by oligarch Aivars Lembergs, and ultimately on 11 June 2022 it voted to leave the alliance, later joined by the Liepāja Party. In May 2022 LZS formed a united list for the 2022 Saeima elections together with the Latvian Association of Regions, the Liepāja Party and an upcoming political NGO led by Liepāja construction contractor Uldis Pīlēns, the United List.

Electoral results

Legislative elections

Chairpersons
Three co-chairpersons share the leadership position at any one time. Former chairpersons of the Latvian Green Party include:
Oļegs Batarevskis (1990–1997)
Valts Vilnītis (1990–1991)
Juris Zvirgzds (1990–1995)
Gunārs Lākutis (1991–1993)
Pēteris Jansons (1993–1994)
Jānis Kalviņš (1994–1995)
Indulis Emsis (from 1995)
Rūta Bendere (1995–1996)
Askolds Kļaviņš (1996–2001)
Valdis Felsbergs (1997–2003)
Viesturs Silenieks (from 2001)
Raimonds Vējonis (from 2003)

, chairpersons are Viesturs Silenieks and Raimonds Vējonis.

See also
Green party
Green politics
List of environmental organizations
Politics of Latvia

References

External links
Official website 
Info of Latvian Green Party on European Green Party website

Conservative parties in Latvia
European Green Party
Green conservative parties
Green political parties in Latvia
Centrist parties in Latvia
Political parties established in 1990
Global Greens member parties
1990 establishments in Latvia